The 1984 United States presidential election in North Carolina took place on November 6, 1984, and was part of the 1984 United States presidential election. Voters chose 13 representatives, or electors to the Electoral College, who voted for president and vice president.

North Carolina strongly voted for the Republican nominee, President Ronald Reagan, over the Democratic nominee, Vice President Walter Mondale in a landslide. The final margin was 61.90% to 37.89%, which compared to the other southern states, was close to the southern average. This margin was a huge swing from 1980, where Reagan had only narrowly carried the state. No Democrat would win in North Carolina  until 2008. , this is the last election in which Vance County and  Chatham County voted for a Republican presidential candidate and Scotland County would not vote Republican again until 2020.

Results

Results by county

References

North Carolina
1984
1984 North Carolina elections